Cuza Vodă is a commune in Călărași County, Muntenia, Romania. It is composed of three villages: Cuza Vodă, Ceacu and Călărașii Vechi. As of 2011 Cuza Vodă had a population of 4,045.

References

Communes in Călărași County
Localities in Muntenia